Saint Anne's Episcopal Church is a historic Episcopal Church in Middletown, Delaware. The town church was built in 1888. The old church was built in 1768 on the site of an earlier wooden church built about 1705. Queen Anne presented the church with a "covering for the communion table."

The church was nominated for inclusion on the National Register of Historic Places on May 2, 1972, and was added to the Register on March 7, 1973.

References

Sources
 

Properties of religious function on the National Register of Historic Places in Delaware
Episcopal church buildings in Delaware
Churches in New Castle County, Delaware
Churches completed in 1768
18th-century Episcopal church buildings
Historic American Buildings Survey in Delaware
Buildings and structures in Middletown, Delaware
1768 establishments in the Thirteen Colonies